The 1808 Vermont gubernatorial election for Governor of Vermont took place throughout September, and resulted in the election of Isaac Tichenor to a one-year term.

The Vermont General Assembly met in Montpelier on October 13. The Vermont House of Representatives appointed a committee to examine the votes of the freemen of Vermont for governor, lieutenant governor, treasurer, and members of the governor's council.

The committee's examination of the votes showed that former Governor Isaac Tichenor defeated incumbent Israel Smith for a one-year term. In the election for lieutenant governor, the voters selected Paul Brigham for his thirteenth one-year term. Benjamin Swan was elected to a one-year term as treasurer, his ninth.

In the races for lieutenant governor and treasurer, the vote totals and names of other candidates were not recorded. In the race for governor, a contemporary newspaper article reported the results as follows.

Results

References

Vermont gubernatorial elections
gubernatorial
Vermont